The Orange County Local Agency Formation Commission, or OC LAFCO, is a government agency that makes decisions regarding boundaries for cities, unincorporated territory (land not located within a city) and special districts (local agencies which provide water, sewer, parks and recreation and other municipal services) within Orange County, California. Orange County LAFCO offices are located in Santa Ana, California.

Funding Source 
OC LAFCO is funded by Orange County's 34 cities, 27 special districts, and the County. The LAFCO apportionment is a state mandate: Government Code Section 56381(1)(A) requires that the County, cities, and special districts each pay one-third of LAFCO’s costs. The agencies' apportionment are based on formulas previously adopted by the Independent Special Districts of Orange County and the Orange County League of Cities.

History 
Following World War II, Orange County experienced a dramatic growth in population and economic development, increasing the demand for housing and public services. The population in Orange County grew from 216,224 in 1950 to 703,925 just ten years later in 1960. By 1970, the County’s population exceeded 1.4 million residents. As development pressures increased to serve Orange County’s growth, land developers tried to find the fastest and most cost effective means of providing basic municipal services such as water, roads, fire protection and sewers. Often this was done without consideration of the long-term consequences on municipal service delivery to Orange County residents.

During the 1950s and early 1960s, some Orange County cities began to haphazardly add annex territory to their boundaries to serve newly developing areas. In addition, numerous special districts were created – many of them with overlapping boundaries, which created inefficiencies and higher costs for residents. To address these issues not only in Orange County, but throughout California, Local Agency Formation Commissions were established by the State Legislature in 1963 in each California county.

Authority 
The legal authority and mandate for Orange County LAFCO, like all LAFCOs in California, are defined by the Cortese-Knox-Hertzberg Local Government Reorganization Act of 2000 (Government Code Section 56000 et seq).

Governance 
Orange County LAFCO’s determinations involving the boundaries of cities and special districts can range from simple to complex actions. The power of LAFCOs to regulate local boundaries includes nine types of boundary changes:

 Annexations (adding territory to a city or special district)
 Detachments (removing territory from a city or special district)
 Disincorporation (terminating the existence of a city)
 Dissolutions (terminating the existence of a special district)
 Formations (creating a new special district)
 Incorporations (creating a new city)
 Mergers (terminating a special district and merging those responsibilities with a city)
 Consolidations (joining two or more cities or special districts into a single agency)
 Reorganizations (two or more changes or organization in a single proposal)

Orange County LAFCO consists of an 11-member Commission, seven regular members and four alternate members. The regular members of the Commission consist of two members from the Orange County Board of Supervisors representing the County, two city council members representing Orange County cities, two members representing special districts and one public “at-large” member. Current members of Orange County LAFCO include:

Regular members
 Derek McGregor – Derek McGregor currently serves as Chair for OC LAFCO. He is a licensed civil engineer and land surveyor. He has served on Orange County LAFCO since July 2009 as a Public Member. 
 John Withers – John Withers is a Director of the Irvine Ranch Water District and has served on Orange County LAFCO since May 1994. He currently serves as Vice-Chair for OC LAFCO and is a Special District Member.
 Todd Spitzer – Todd Spitzer was elected to the Orange County Board of Supervisors in 2012. Spitzer was previously a County Supervisor in 1997 and was subsequently elected in 2002 to the California State Assembly representing the 71st District. He has served Orange County LAFCO since 2012 and is appointed by the Orange County Board of Supervisors as a County Representative.
 Lisa Bartlett – Lisa Bartlett was elected to the Orange County Board of Supervisors in 2014 after two terms as Mayor and City Councilwoman for the City of Dana Point. She has served on Orange County LAFCO since December 2014 and is appointed by the Orange County Board of Supervisors as a County Representative.
 Allan Bernstein – Dr. Bernstein is foot and ankle surgeon in private practice in Tustin for 23 years. Dr. Berstein was elected to City Council in the City of Tustin in 2012. Dr. Bernstein serves as the City Member.
 Cheryl Brothers – Cheryl Brothers was elected to the City of Fountain Valley in 2012. She was previously served as a Fountain Valley councilmember in 2002-2006 and 2006-2010. Ms. Brothers was elected by the ISDOC selection committee to serve as the alternate city member on Orange County LAFCO. Brothers serves as a City Member.
 Charley Wilson – Charley Wilson is a Director of the Santa Margarita Water District, the second largest retail water agency in Orange County. He has served on Orange County since April 2001. He is a Special District Member.

Alternate members
 
 Andrew Do – Andrew Do is a former Chief of Staff to a former Orange County Supervisor and Deputy District Attorney. He was elected to office in a special election in March 2015. He was subsequently appointed to the LAFCO Commission and is appointed by the Orange County Board of Supervisors as an Alternate County Representative.
 James Fisler – James Fisler is a Director on the Mesa Consolidated Water District and has served on Orange County LAFCO since February 2011. He serves as an Alternate Public Member.
 Kathryn Freshley - Kathryn Freshley is a resident of Laguna Woods, California. Freshley is retired after serving several years in the private sector as an electrical engineer and business executive. She serves as an Alternate City Member.

OC LAFCO projects 
Each LAFCO in California, although governed by the same set of laws, reflects the unique geography, constituency and issues of its home county. Each LAFCO designs and implements policies, programs and procedures that can best assist their own county to enhance local services. What works in one county may not necessarily work in another county. 
OC LAFCO has pioneered a “partnering” effort with Orange County’s cities and special districts and is dedicated to improving the lives of residents by creating whole and healthy communities served by effective and efficient municipal service providers. Three of its current projects that foster OC LAFCO’s partnering spirit include the Shared Services Program, Fiscal Trends Program and the Islands Task Force.

Shared services 
Orange County LAFCO has recently undertaken a partnering effort with its member agencies (the County of Orange, Orange County cities and Orange County special districts) to provide opportunities for local agencies to increase their efficiency in providing municipal services and to monitor their ongoing financial condition. The Shared Services Program is a web-based tool, which matches agencies seeking specific services with other agencies offering services. Launched in June 2011, the program is anticipated to be a no-cost, user-friendly resource for local agencies in Orange County interested in sharing services to save money, enhance or maintain service levels, or both.

Fiscal trends 
The Fiscal Trend Analysis Program is a web-based financial “dashboard” developed by Orange County LAFCO that allows agencies and the public to assess the financial condition of local agencies. Similar to a car’s dashboard, the program provides a visual, graphic depiction of an agency’s financial information (based on eight key economic indicators). The program’s eight indicators are updated annually to ensure that the data remains current.

Community Task Force 
The Community Task Force (formally known as Islands Task Force), composed of county, city, and LAFCO representatives, was initially started in 2010 as a way to “jump start” the annexation of unincorporated “islands” - territory not within a city (but surrounded by a city) - that receives municipal services from the County. The ideas/issues that came out of the Task Force discussions caused OC LAFCO to re-evaluate its approach to improving services for Orange County residents. Annexation to cities, once the Commission’s highest priority, became one of a number of tools that OC LAFCO now uses to increase the efficiency of municipal services and build whole and healthy communities.

At the 2013 CALAFCO Annual Conference in Squaw Creek, OC LAFCO was awarded the “Government Leadership” award for its proactive effort on the Community Islands Task Force project.  Receipt of this award provides recognition of the Commission for its creative vision to develop “outside the box” initiatives to address both short and long term service needs of Orange County communities.

References

External links

County government agencies in California
Government in Orange County, California
1963 establishments in California